Cybosia is a monotypic moth genus in the subfamily Arctiinae erected by Jacob Hübner in 1819. Its only species, Cybosia mesomella, the four-dotted footman, was first described by Carl Linnaeus in his 1758 10th edition of Systema Naturae.

Forms
Cybosia mesomella f. flava (yellow)
Cybosia mesomella f. albescens (ivory colored)

Description
The wingspan is 25–33 mm. The basic colour of the forewings may be yellow or ivory greyish with yellow borders. The forewings show in the middle four small black dots (hence the common name of this species). The hindwings are grey, sometimes with yellowish edges. The thorax and the abdomen are whitish, covered with fine hairs.

Biology

This species has one generation per year. Females lay eggs in early July on the larval food plants. The eggs hatch in August or early September. The larvae overwinter and pupate the following spring, from May up to the beginning of June. The moths fly at dusk from June to mid-August depending on location. The larvae feed mainly after dark on low vegetation such as heather, willows, Leontodon autumnalis and Vaccinium uliginosum. They are lichen and algae feeders like most other lithosiines.

Distribution
This species can be found in most of Europe except Spain, in the east Palearctic realm and in the Near East.

Habitat
Cybosia mesomella prefers warm, moist and sunny environment, deciduous and mixed forests, heaths, moorland, damp grassland, fens, wet meadows and open woodlands.

References 

 Witt, T.J. & L. Ronkay, 2011: Lymantriinae and Arctiinae - Including Phylogeny and Check List of the Quadrifid Noctuoidea of Europe. Noctuidae Europaeae Volume 13: 1-448.

External links
 Lepiforum e.V.

Taxa named by Jacob Hübner
Taxa named by Carl Linnaeus
Lithosiina
Moths described in 1758
Moths of Europe
Moths of the Middle East
Moths of Asia
Monotypic moth genera